Syriac Supplement is a Unicode block containing supplementary Syriac letters used for writing the Suriyani Malayalam dialect.

Block

History
The following Unicode-related documents record the purpose and process of defining specific characters in the Syriac Supplement block:

References 

Unicode blocks